The High Wycombe Chair Making Museum CIC in  High Wycombe, England, houses a collection of antique tools, and explains the process of how the bodgers worked in the woods through to the finished Windsor Chairs.

References

Museums in Buckinghamshire
High Wycombe
Furniture museums
Chair-making
Decorative arts museums in England
Museums in England
Industry museums in England